Elsa Pooley (born Elsa Susanna Bond: 1947 in Johannesburg), is a South African botanist, landscaper, tour guide, and artist.

Biography
She lived in and explored the game reserves Ndumu and Mkuzi for about 20 years, where she became inspired by the flora of the region. She collected plants, painted them, wrote about them, and gardened with them. Her work has been exhibited throughout South Africa which has led to commissions, both local and abroad. Her paintings have appeared in the series Flowering Plants of Africa and her limited edition portfolio 'Palms of Africa' (1988) has been sold worldwide. She was commissioned to do paintings for the Blue Train in 1999.

Pooley has lived at Clansthal on the KwaZulu-Natal South Coast since 1984, and spends her time painting, writing and conducting painting tours of KwaZulu-Natal and Lesotho. She is a founder member of BAASA, the Botanical Artists' Association of Southern Africa.

Elsa Pooley was married to Tony Pooley (1938-2004), a game ranger and renowned authority on crocodiles. She had three sons from the marriage - Simon, Justin and Thomas.

Books
  with Vincent Carruthers
 Mashesha - The Making of a Game Ranger. 1992 with Tony Pooley

 with Vincent Carruthers
 with Vincent Carruthers

 with Geoff Nichols

Papers
 
 
 
 
 Pooley, E.S. (1980) "A report on a study of Smilax kraussiana in the St Lucia Resort Game Park". Internal report, Natal Parks Board.

Awards
1996 Conservationist of the Year from the Wildlife & Environment Society (Natal Branch)
1999 Certificate of Merit for Outstanding Contribution to Botany from the South African Association of Botanists
2000 Bronze Medal at the Inaugural Kirstenbosch Exhibition of Botanical Art
2004 Marloth Medal from the Botanical Society of Southern Africa
2008 Honorary Doctor of Science by the University of KwaZulu-Natal

References

External links

Biography on Flora & Fauna Publications Trust website
An interview with Elsa Pooley

Botanical illustrators
1947 births
Living people
South African non-fiction writers
South African women writers